Archibald Campbell Niven (December 8, 1803 – February 21, 1882) was an American politician who served one term as a U.S. Representative from New York from 1845 to 1847.

Biography 
Born in Newburgh, New York, Niven completed preparatory studies.  He was Surrogate of Sullivan County, New York from 1828 to 1840, and was Adjutant General of the New York State Militia in 1844.

Congress 
Niven was elected as a Democrat to the 29th United States Congress, holding office from March 4, 1845, to March 3, 1847.

Later career 
He was District Attorney of Sullivan County from 1847 to 1850; and a member of the New York State Senate (9th D.) in 1864. His election was contested by Republican Henry R. Low who was seated in place of Niven on January 17 for the session of 1865.

Death 
Niven died in Monticello, New York, February 21, 1882.  He was interred in Rock Ridge Cemetery.

Sources

 The New York Civil List compiled by Franklin Benjamin Hough, Stephen C. Hutchins and Edgar Albert Werner (1870; pg. 244, 267, 443 and 543)

1803 births
1882 deaths
Sullivan County district attorneys
Democratic Party New York (state) state senators
Politicians from Newburgh, New York
People from Monticello, New York
Democratic Party members of the United States House of Representatives from New York (state)
19th-century American politicians